Henry (c.1020-c.1044/5) was a member of the Aleramid dynasty.

He was a younger son of William III of Montferrat and Waza. From 1042, he was co-ruler of the March of Montferrat with his older brother Otto II of Montferrat.

Probably in 1041, certainly before 19 January 1042, he married Adelaide of Susa, the heiress of the March of Turin, which temporarily united the two great northwestern Italian marches of Turin and Montferrat.

References
 R. Merlone, 'Prosopografia aleramica (secolo X e prima metà dell'XI),' Bollettino storico-bibliografico subalpino, LXXXI, (1983), 451–585.

External links
Heinrich I, Margraf von Montferrat (in German)

Notes

1045 deaths
Marquesses of Montferrat
Aleramici
Year of birth unknown
Year of birth uncertain